Assesos or Assesus was a small ancient Greek town in the region of Caria in Asia Minor, near Miletus, and the site of a sanctuary of Athena. It is mentioned by Herodotus in his Histories (I.18–23) in the context of an episode during the war between the Lydians under Sadyattes and the Milesians in the late 7th century BC, when Lydian troops destroyed the sanctuary with fire. Herodotus also writes that after the peace between the two enemies the Alyattes of Lydia built two temples dedicated to Athena at the city.

The site of the ancient settlement has been identified by archaeologists at the modern location Mengerev Tepe, some 7 km south-east of ancient Miletus.

References

Peter Herrmann, Denis Feissel (2006): Inschriften von Milet: Milet. Inschriften n. 1020 - 1580, Vol.3/6, p. 172
Alan M. Greaves (2002) Miletus: A history. London: Routledge. p. 75

Archaeological sites in the Aegean Region
History of Aydın Province
Ancient Greek archaeological sites in Turkey
Populated places in ancient Caria